Emily Rose Caroline Wilson (born 1971) is a British classicist and the Professor of Classical Studies at the University of Pennsylvania. In 2017 she became the first woman to publish a translation of Homer's Odyssey into English.

Early life and education
Wilson "comes from a long line of academics", including both her parents, A. N. Wilson and Katherine Duncan-Jones, her uncle, and her maternal grandparents, including Elsie Duncan-Jones. Her sister is the food writer Bee Wilson. Wilson's parents divorced shortly before she went to college.

Wilson was "shy but accomplished" in school. A graduate of Balliol College, Oxford, in 1994 (B.A. in literae humaniores, classical literature, and philosophy), she undertook her master's degree in English literature 1500–1660 at Corpus Christi College, Oxford (1996), and her Ph.D. (2001) in classical and comparative literature at Yale University. Her thesis was entitled Why Do I Overlive?: Greek, Latin and English Tragic Survival.

Career

Wilson has authored five books. The first, Mocked With Death (2005), grew out of her dissertation and examines mortality in the tragic tradition: "our constant awareness of all that we will lose, are losing, have lost." The work received the Charles Bernheimer Prize of the American Comparative Literature Association in 2003. In 2006, she was named a Fellow of the American Academy in Rome in Renaissance & Early Modern scholarship (Rome Prize). Her next book, The Death of Socrates (2007), examines Socrates' execution. Wilson later reflected that she was interested in the ways and methods that Socrates would educate people, but also Socrates' death as an image: "What does it mean to live with so much integrity that you can be absolutely yourself at every moment, even when you've just poisoned yourself?"

Wilson's next works primarily focused on Rome's tragic playwright Seneca. In 2010, she translated Seneca's tragedies, with an introduction and notes, in Six Tragedies of Seneca. In 2014 she published The Greatest Empire: A Life of Seneca. She later noted that Seneca is an interesting subject because "he's so precise in articulating what it means to have a very, very clear vision of the good life and to be completely unable to follow through on living the good life." Wilson commented on the challenges of translating Seneca's ornate rhetorical style, saying that Senecan bombast in contemporary English risks sounding "too silly to be impressive. It has to go very close to sounding silly, but without quite getting there."

Wilson is a book reviewer for The Times Literary Supplement, the London Review of Books, and The New Republic. She is also the classics editor for The Norton Anthology of World Literature and The Norton Anthology of Western Literature.

In January 2020, Wilson joined the Booker Prize judging panel, alongside Margaret Busby (chair), Lee Child, Sameer Rahim and Lemn Sissay.

Odyssey translation

Wilson is perhaps best known for her critically acclaimed translation of The Odyssey (2017), becoming the first woman to publish a translation of the work into English. Following a lengthy introduction, she provides a translation of Homer's work in iambic pentameter. Wilson's Odyssey was named by The New York Times as one of its 100 notable books of 2018 and it was shortlisted for the 2018 National Translation Award. In 2019, Wilson was the recipient of a MacArthur Fellowship for her work bringing classical literature to new audiences.

Beginning, "Tell me about a complicated man", Wilson's metrical verse includes some creative and unusual phrases (such as "journeyways of fish"), although much of her verse translation uses "plain, contemporary language", attending to both Homer's "fleetness" and "rhythm and musicality".  Following many other Homeric scholars, she has argued that the hierarchical societies depicted in the Homeric poems are not viewed uncritically by the narrator, and that the poems include many voices and many distinct points of view. In one noteworthy choice, enslaved characters, described as "dmoiai" or "dmoioi" in the Greek, are often referred to as "slaves" in Wilson's versions, instead of "maids" or "servants"; Wilson has expressed surprise that so many modern North American translations obscure the social structures, noting "how much work seems to go into making slavery invisible."

Wilson has noted that being a woman did not predetermine her critical work as a scholar, reader or translator, and has expressed discomfort with the media reception of her work in terms of gender, since it tends to obscure her primary goals (such as the use of regular meter and attention to sound), and risks erasing the work of other female Homerists and female translators.   Wilson has emphasized that other female translators of Homer, such as Anne Dacier and Rosa Onesti, made very different interpretative choices from hers.

Bibliography

Books and translations
 
The Death of Socrates: Hero, Villain, Chatterbox, Saint, Harvard University Press, 2007. .
Seneca: Six Tragedies, Oxford University Press, 2010. .
The Greatest Empire: A Life of Seneca, Oxford University Press, 2014. .
Euripides: The Greek Plays, Modern Library/Random House, 2016. [Wilson translated Helen, Bacchae, Trojan Women and Electra in this volume]
The Odyssey (Homer), W. W. Norton & Company, 2017. .
Oedipus Tyrannos (Sophocles), W. W. Norton & Company, 2021. .
The Iliad (Homer), W. W. Norton & Company, 2023.

Articles
"Found in Translation: Reading the classics with help from the Loeb Library", Slate, 15 August 2006.
Nikos G. Charalabopoulos, Platonic Drama and its Ancient Reception, review, Bryn Mawr Classical Review, 2012.12.62.
"The Origins of Foreigners", review of Rethinking the Other in Antiquity By Erich S. Gruen, The New Republic, 24 August 2012.
"The Trouble With Speeches: The Birth of Political Rhetoric in an Ancient Democracy", review of Demosthenes of Athens and the Fall of Classical Greece by Ian Worthington, The New Republic, 27 April 2013.
The Dramaturgy of Senecan Tragedy by Thomas Kohn, review, Classical Journal, 7 September 2013.
"Homer's Iliad. Translated by Anthony Verity", review, Translation and Literature volume 22, issue 2; 2013. .
Across the Pond – An Englishman's view of America by Terry Eagleton, review, The Times Literary Supplement, 30 August 2013.
"Slut-Shaming Helen of Troy", review of Helen of Troy: Beauty, Myth, Devastation by Ruby Blondell, The New Republic, 26 April 2014.
In Plain Sight: The life and lies of Jimmy Savile by Dan Davies, review, The Times Literary Supplement, 21 November 2014.
Seneca, the fat-cat philosopher, review, The Guardian, 27 March 2015.
The Secret of Rome's Success, review of SPQR by Mary Beard, The Atlantic, December 2015.
"A Doggish Translation" (review of The Poems of Hesiod: Theogony, Works and Days, and The Shield of Herakles, translated from the Greek by Barry B. Powell, University of California Press, 2017, 184 pp.), The New York Review of Books, vol. LXV, no. 1 (18 January 2018), pp. 34–36.
"Ah, how miserable!" (review of three separate translations of The Oresteia by Aeschylus: by Oliver Taplin, Liveright, November 2018; by Jeffrey Scott Bernstein, Carcanet, April 2020; and by David Mulroy, Wisconsin, April 2018), London Review of Books, vol. 42, no. 19 (8 October 2020), pp. 9–12, 14.

Critical studies and reviews of Wilson's work
Carolyne Larrington, "The hemlock and the chatterbox", The Times Literary Supplement, 17 October 2007.
Marc Mastrangelo, "Emily Wilson, The Death of Socrates. Profiles in History.", Bryn Mawr Classical Review, Dickinson College, 2009.
Christopher Trinacty, "Emily R. Wilson (trans.), Seneca. Six Tragedies.", Bryn Mawr Classical Review, Oberlin College, 2010.
Tim Whitmarsh, "Nero to Zero", Literary Review, March 2015.
Christopher Bray, "Seneca: A Life review – absorbing account of the philosopher's life", The Guardian, 15 March 2015.
Emily Gowers, "Seneca: A Life by Emily Wilson review – temptation and virtue in imperial Rome", The Guardian, 4 April 2015.
Barbara Graziosi, "Seneca: A Life by Emily Wilson", Times Higher Education, 30 April 2015.

Critical studies and reviews of the Odyssey (2017)
Yung In Chae, "Women Who Weave: Reading Emily Wilson's Translation of the Odyssey With Margaret Atwood's The Penelopiad", Eidolon, 16 November 2017.
Annalisa Quinn, "Emily Wilson's 'Odyssey' Scrapes The Barnacles Off Homer's Hull", NPR – Books, 2 December 2017.
Madeline Miller, "The first English translation of 'The Odyssey' by a woman was worth the wait",  The Washington Post, 16 November 2017.
Rebecca Newberger Goldstein, "The Odyssey and the Other",  The Atlantic, December 2017.
 
Richard Whitaker, "Homer's Odyssey Three Ways: Recent Translations by Verity, Wilson, and Green", Acta Classica: Classical Association of South Africa Volume 63, 2020, 27 July 2020.

Notes

1971 births
Living people
Alumni of Balliol College, Oxford
Alumni of Corpus Christi College, Oxford
Yale Graduate School of Arts and Sciences alumni
English classical scholars
Women classical scholars
Classical scholars of the University of Pennsylvania
Iowa Writers' Workshop faculty
Place of birth missing (living people)
Translators of Homer
Greek–English translators